Green Valley High School may refer to:

Green Valley High School (Nevada), Henderson, Nevada
Green Valley High School (California), Yucaipa, California